Biryuchevskaya is a rural locality (a village) in Sibirskoye Rural Settlement, Verkhovazhsky District, Vologda Oblast, Russia. The population was 21 as of 2002.

Geography 
Biryuchevskaya is located 48 km southeast of Verkhovazhye (the district's administrative centre) by road. Ivanovskaya is the nearest rural locality.

References 

Rural localities in Verkhovazhsky District